General Tyler may refer to:

 Daniel Tyler (1799–1882), iron manufacturer, railroad president, and one of the first Union Army generals of the American Civil War
 Erastus B. Tyler (1822–1891), American businessman, merchant, and a general in the Union Army during the American Civil War
 Joel Tyler (fl. 1980s–2020s), United States Army major general
 Robert C. Tyler (1832–1865), Confederate brigadier general during the American Civil War
 Robert O. Tyler (1831–1874), general in the Union Army during the American Civil War
 Timothy Tyler (active 1972–2008), Major-General and former Quartermaster-General to the Forces in the British Army